Split Rock (also Splitrock) is an unincorporated community located in the town of Fairbanks, Shawano County, Wisconsin, United States.

History
A post office called Split Rock was established in 1889, and remained in operation until it was discontinued in 1935. The community was supposedly named for a nearby rock which had split in half.

References

Unincorporated communities in Shawano County, Wisconsin
Unincorporated communities in Wisconsin